Brand New Theatre USC, abbreviated BNT, is the oldest student theater company at the University of Southern California, and the only organization on campus to produce only student-written work. BNT was founded by Joe Douglass in 1996 to allow student playwrights the opportunity to see their work produced, and give student actors and directors the opportunity to shape a show in collaboration with its writer.  BNT prioritizes the inclusion of undergraduate students from outside the USC School of Dramatic Arts, and USC students from widely disparate majors and departments have participated as actors, writers, directors, and producers for BNT shows. The organization's name draws from the fact that it only produces original work; every show is brand new.

One-Act Plays
The productions for which they are best-known, BNT produces a series of one-acts every semester. The organization curates submissions from throughout the student body, and a reading committee made up of BNT executives and student volunteers read every show and collectively select the one-acts that will together produce the strongest show; typically four are chosen. At this point, the playwrights participate in a writing workshop to finalize their scripts, and often remain involved in the drafting and production process in collaboration with their show's director and cast.

Full-Length Show
In 2012, BNT produced its first full-length student-written show, and has continued to do so every Spring. The process is similar to that of the one-acts: submissions are called for, and a reading committee selects a single show to be produced.

List of BNT Full-Length Productions
2012: Here's The Thing by Jake Minton
2013: Get. That. Snitch. by Achilles Capone
2014: Animal Stories by Molly Sharpe
2015: The Adventurers Club by Kyle Bellar
2016: Stars & Shadows by Jonathan Stoller-Schoff
2017: This Our Now by Olivia Cordell

24-Hour Festival
BNT also sponsors a 24-hour theater festival every spring. From 10 pm to 10 am, individuals and teams work together to produce the script for a show or a series of shows based on a prompt. Then, from 10 am to 10 pm, the script is passed off to actors and producers, who memorize lines, block the show, acquire necessary props, costumes, and sets, and rehearse the show. At 10 pm, the curtain goes up, exactly one day after the show was first conceived.

Writers' Workshop
In 2014, BNT will expand its one-acts writers workshop into an open forum that meets regularly, as a resource for student playwrights throughout USC to offer feedback and help to one another on scripts they're drafting. The workshop meets twice a month, and is not officially associated with the selection process for BNT's productions that year.

See also 

University of Southern California
USC School of Dramatic Arts

External links 
Official Brand New Theatre Website

Daily Trojan article on the founding of Brand New Theater, Nov. 15, 1996

 

Theatre companies in Los Angeles
Performing groups established in 1997
Student theatre
University and college theatres in the United States
University performing groups
University of Southern California